Lawrence Emile Yarborough, Jr. (born February 26, 1962) is a former Republican member of the North Carolina House of Representatives who represented the state's 2nd district, including constituents in Granville and Person counties from 2015 to 2023. A businessman from Roxboro, North Carolina, Yarborough was elected to his first term in 2014.

North Carolina General Assembly
Yarborough served on the Person County Board of Commissioners from 2004 to 2008. In 2010, Yarborough announced he would challenge Winkie Wilkins for the district 55 seat in the NC House, though he later withdrew from the race. In 2014 he ran for the seat again (this time renumbered as the 2nd district) and defeated Democrat Ray Jeffers in the 2014 November general election. Yarborough serves on eight North Carolina House Select Committees including Agriculture, Alcoholic Beverage Control, Appropriations, Agriculture and Natural and Economic Resources, Commerce and Job Development, Environment, Health, and Transportation. He is also a member of the Environmental Review Commission.

In November 2015, Rep, Yarborough was appointed to serve on the Environmental Review Commission. He was also appointed to serve as an advisory member on the Joint Legislative Oversight Committee on General Government and Joint Legislative Transportation Oversight Committee.

Electoral history

2022

2020

2018

2016

2014

Committee assignments

2021-2022 Session
Appropriations 
Appropriations - Agriculture and Natural and Economic Resources (Vice Chair)
Environment (Chair)
Wildlife Resources (Chair)
Regulatory Reform (Vice Chair)
Agriculture 
Ethics 
Marine Resources and Aqua Culture

2019-2020 Session
Appropriations 
Appropriations - Agriculture and Natural and Economic Resources (Vice Chair)
Environment (Chair)
Regulatory Reform (Chair)
Wildlife Resources (Vice Chair)
Agriculture 
Alcoholic Beverage Control 
Ethics

2017-2018 Session
Appropriations
Appropriations - Agriculture and Natural and Economic Resources
Environment (Chair)
Regulatory Reform (Vice Chair)
Agriculture
Alcoholic Beverage Control
Health

2015-2016 Session
Appropriations
Appropriations - Agriculture and Natural and Economic Resources
Agriculture (Vice Chair)
Alcoholic Beverage Control
Commerce and Job Development
Environment
Health
Transportation

References

External links
NCGA bio page
Project Vote Smart

Living people
1962 births
People from Pass Christian, Mississippi
People from Roxboro, North Carolina
Tulane University alumni
County commissioners in North Carolina
Republican Party members of the North Carolina House of Representatives
21st-century American politicians